is a railway station on the JR East Tsugaru Line located in the village of Yomogita, Aomori Prefecture, Japan.

Lines

Station layout
Gōsawa Station has two opposed ground-level side platforms connected by a level crossing. The station is unattended.

Platforms

History
Gōsawa Station was opened on November 25, 1959 as a station on the Japanese National Railways (JNR). With the privatization of the JNR on April 1, 1987, it came under the operational control of JR East.

Surrounding area

See also
 List of Railway Stations in Japan

External links

 

Stations of East Japan Railway Company
Railway stations in Aomori Prefecture
Tsugaru Line
Yomogita, Aomori
Railway stations in Japan opened in 1959